James Harvey Ganong (January 9, 1841 – April 21, 1888) was a Canadian businessman in St. Stephen, New Brunswick who co-founded Ganong Bros. chocolate making company in 1873 and the St. Croix Soap Manufacturing Co. in 1878.

Biography 

Born in Springfield, New Brunswick, James was the eldest of the six children of Francis Daniel Ganong and Deborah Ruth Keirstead. In 1863, he married Susan E. Brittain of Carleton, New Brunswick with whom he had seven children. His father was a farmer and a merchant and as a young man, James worked as a shopkeeper and as a travelling salesman. He lived in Massachusetts for a few years where two of his children were born.

In 1873, he and his brother Gilbert moved to the border town of St. Stephen on the St. Croix River across from Calais, Maine. There, they established a grocery business and within a few years added a bakery and confectionery manufactory plus expanded their retailing to include a store in Calais.

Successful, in 1878 the brothers, in partnership with Freeman H. Todd, built the St. Croix Soap Manufacturing Company but in 1884 they elected to dissolve their partnership. Gilbert Ganong retained the store, bakery and confectionery business while James took over the soap factory. The soap-making business continued to do very well and became widely known for its Surprise Soap brand that eventually was distributed nationally.

James Ganong was actively involved in community affairs and served as mayor of St. Stephen. He died unexpectedly in 1888 at the age of forty-seven upon which his son, Edwin, took over the running of the soap business. Gilbert Ganong died without issue and James's son Arthur would take over the chocolate business.

References
The Canadian Encyclopedia
 Folster, David. The Chocolate Ganongs of St. Stephen, New Brunswick (1991) Goose Lane Editions 
 

1841 births
1888 deaths
Canadian Baptists
Businesspeople from New Brunswick
Canadian chief executives
People from Kings County, New Brunswick
People from St. Stephen, New Brunswick
People from Washington County, Maine
James
Canadian expatriates in the United States
19th-century Baptists